Padmakar Ramachandra Dubhashi (7 March 1930 – 31 August 2020) was an Indian civil servant, administrator, author, social scientist and academician, known for his administrative and academic abilities. He was a pioneer of Cooperative movement and was instrumental in housing the Goa University in a new campus, a feat he accomplished during his tenure as the Vice-Chancellor of the University. The Government of India honoured him, in 2010, with Padma Bhushan, the third highest civilian award, for his services to the nation.

Biography

P. R. Dubhashi was born on 7 March 1930 in Karwar district of the South Indian state of Karnataka. He received a MA and a Ph.D   from Pune University and a DLitt from Bombay University. In 1953, he joined the Indian Administrative Service.

He started his career in Davangere, as a divisional officer. During a career as a public servant starting in 1953, he held many posts of importance such as Divisional Commissioner, Additional Secretary in the Ministry of Agriculture, the Director of the Indian Institute of Public Administration (IIPA) and the Government Secretary in the Prime Minister's Office, from where he retired in 1981. In between, he was selected for British Council scholarship to the London School of Economics where he obtained a post graduate diploma in Economic and Social Administration, in 1963.

The Government of India continued to make use of his service, even after his retirement and he served in such capacities as member of the Expert Committee on Rural Finance for NABARD and as the Chairman of the Management Institutes Committee for the Pune University. He was also active organising conferences and delivering key lectures such as Dr. Zakir Hussain Memorial Lecture and John Mathai Memorial Lecture. In 1990, he was appointed as the Vice-Chancellor of Goa University. By the time he retired from the post in 1995, he was successful in moving the University to a new campus. He has also worked with international agencies like IFAD and Asian Development Bank as consultant. He was the Chairman of Bharatiya Vidya Bhavan, at its Pune centre.

Dubhashi was married to Sindhu and the couple had a daughter, Medha and a son, Devadatt, both pursuing academic careers.

Awards and recognitions
 Padma Bhushan – 2013
 Lokhitwadi Gopal Hari Deshmukh Award – Maharashtra Sahitya Parishad – 2006
 Ganesh Saraswati Thakurdesai Award – Maharashtra Sahitya Parishad – 1999
 Shiromani Award – 1993

 Gokhale Institute of Politics and Economics, Pune has  named an annual lecture after him.

Writings
Dubhashi authored 27 books of which 21 are in English and 6 in Marathi. He wrote on topics such as economic planning, public administration, rural development, cooperative movement and other social issues. .

Books
 Essays in Public Administration, 1985
 
 Administrative Reforms, 1986
 Essays in Development Administration, 1986
 Economic Thought Of The Twentieth Century And Other Essays, 1995
 Recent Trends in Public Administration, 1995
 Essays on rural development, 1996
 
 Pursuing Idealism Through Civil Service: Memories of an Administrator and a Trainer, 2007

External links
 List of Books on Amazon
 List of articles on Mainstream Weekly
 Padma Bhushan award ceremony video coverage on YouTube
 On Google Scholar
 Articles on Economic and Political Weekly

References

1930 births
2020 deaths
Recipients of the Padma Bhushan in civil service
Indian Administrative Service officers
People from Karwar
People from Uttara Kannada
Konkani people